The Iowa–Wisconsin football rivalry is an American college football rivalry between the Iowa Hawkeyes and Wisconsin Badgers. Both schools have competed as members of the Big Ten Conference since 1900 (Wisconsin since 1896), and both currently compete in the conference’s West division.

History
The Heartland Trophy is a brass bull that is presented to the winner of the annual game. Although the rivalry is over 100 years old, the trophy is relatively new. It was first presented in 2004 to Iowa, when they defeated Wisconsin 30–7 to claim a share of the conference title. In 2005, Iowa spoiled the last home game for Wisconsin head coach Barry Alvarez, defeating the Badgers at a rain-soaked Camp Randall Stadium 20–10. The Badgers took possession of the trophy for the first time in 2006, defeating Iowa 24–21 in a back-and-forth affair. Wisconsin evened the Heartland Trophy series in 2007, winning another closely contested game 17–13, under the lights at Camp Randall. In 2008, Iowa took the lead in the trophy series with a lopsided 38–16 victory. The Hawkeyes' second-half performance was key again in 2009, as they won 20–10 in Madison. The 2010 game was decided in the final minute, as the Badgers scored a late touchdown for a 31–30 victory at Kinnick Stadium. As of the 2022 season, Wisconsin leads the trophy series 10–7.

Due to Big Ten expansion, Wisconsin and Iowa were placed in separate divisions, ostensibly ending the annual rivalry after the 2010 season. The annual game resumed, however, during the 2014 season, when a new round of expansion (adding Maryland and Rutgers to the Big Ten), placed Wisconsin and Iowa together in the Big Ten West division.

Game results

See also  
 List of NCAA college football rivalry games

References

College football rivalries in the United States
Iowa Hawkeyes football
Wisconsin Badgers football
Big Ten Conference rivalries